John William Spencer (October 30, 1897 – January 22, 1984) was an American Negro league outfielder in 1921 and 1922.

A native of Lynchburg, Virginia, Spencer played for the Homestead Grays and Pittsburgh Keystones in 1921, and returned to Pittsburgh to finish his career in 1922. He died in Schenectady, New York in 1984 at age 86.

References

External links
 and Baseball-Reference Black Baseball stats and Seamheads

1897 births
1984 deaths
Homestead Grays players
Pittsburgh Keystones players
Baseball outfielders
Baseball players from Virginia
People from Lynchburg, Virginia
20th-century African-American sportspeople
Burials at Albany Rural Cemetery